Ferre Grignard (13 March 1939 – 8 August 1982) was a Belgian skiffle-singer from Antwerp, Belgium.  He had success with a number of songs, such as "Ring Ring, I've Got To Sing", "Yama, Yama, Hey", and "My Crucified Jesus".

Biography
Ferre Grignard was born in Antwerp in 1939. He learned to play the harmonica and guitar when he was young.  At the end of the 1950s, he went to a Antwerp art academy where he formed a skiffle group. He was unsuccessful as a painter, but he could play the guitar and sing the blues and his performances in "De Muze", an Antwerp jazz café, made him well known in the Antwerp artists' world. He went to the United States for a time but was expelled for being an anarchist.

The young generation accepted him as the first Belgian protest singer, because of his hippie-like appearance and the content of his songs. In 1965 he performed at the first "Jazz-festival" at Bilzen. He was discovered by Hans Kusters (who owned the record company HKM). His first single "Ring Ring, I've Got to Sing" was released and charted in Belgium and the Netherlands. Other songs such as "Yama, Yama, Hey", "Drunken Sailor", "My Crucified Jesus" also charted with their mixture of skiffle, folk music and blues. At the height of his career he performed at the Paris Olympia. The Belgian artist George Smits was a member of Ferre Grignard's band around that time.

After the ensuing international success, things started to go wrong. He went to live in a mansion, where he made music, painted and partied with the 20 friends who lived with him. He also refused to fill in his tax-forms, so he was ordered to pay the taxes and large part of the royalties from his music went directly to taxes.  He neglected his career and was soon forgotten by his fans. A comeback in the 1970s failed.

He died in Antwerp of throat cancer in 1982. At that time he was living in an attic without heating, surrounded by empty bottles. Grignard was buried at the Schoonselhof cemetery, among many of Antwerp's most notable citizens.

Discography

References

External links
 

1939 births
1982 deaths
20th-century Belgian male singers
20th-century Belgian singers
Belgian folk singers
Belgian male guitarists
Belgian painters
Deaths from cancer in Belgium
Deaths from throat cancer
Musicians from Antwerp
Skiffle musicians
English-language singers from Belgium
20th-century guitarists